Neochalcosia is a genus of moths of the family Zygaenidae.

Species
Neochalcosia remota (Walker, 1862)
Neochalcosia nanlingensis Owada, Horie & Min, 2006
Neochalcosia witti Buchsbaum, Chen & Speidel, 2010

References

 , 2010: Neochalcosia witti sp. n., a new Zygaenidae species (Chalcosiinae) from southeast China (Lepidoptera). Entomofauna 31: 493-504
 , 2006: A new moth of the genus Neochalcosia (Lepidoptera, Zygaenidae, Chalcosiinae) from the Nanling Mountains, Guangdong, with notes on the daily behaviour of male Neochalcosia. Tinea 19(2): 129-136.

Chalcosiinae